Dickon Edwards (born Richard Dickon Edwards; 3 September 1971), also known as Dickon Angel, is a London-based indie pop musician and diarist. He was a founding member of the bands Orlando and Fosca, and briefly played guitar in the band Spearmint.

Known for his dandy aesthetic, Dickon has peroxide blonde hair and is often seen in a white, blue, or silver-grey three-piece suit, the silver-grey suit being a bequest from fellow London dandy Sebastian Horsley.

He has kept a blog called The Diary at the Centre of the Earth since 8 December 1997 (predating the 1999 coining of the term "blog" - he terms it an "online diary"). Excerpts from the blog were included in Travis Elborough and Nick Rennison's A London Year and in the follow-up title A Traveller's Year.

In March 2008 he released a printed collection of lyrics titled The Portable Dickon Edwards, which was released in a limited edition alongside Fosca's The Painted Side of the Rocket album.

In 2021, Edwards completed a PhD on Ronald Firbank and the Legacy of Camp Modernism at Birkbeck College, University of London.

Personal life
Edwards is a son of the quiltmaker and author Lynne Edwards MBE, and the cartoonist Brian "Bib" Edwards. His brother was the Adam Ant guitarist, Tom Edwards.

References

External links
Dickon Edwards' Website  and Blog

English bloggers
English pop guitarists
English male guitarists
Living people
1971 births
People from Bildeston
British male bloggers
21st-century British guitarists
21st-century British male musicians
Romo